Gian Robert J. Mamuyac (born March 5, 1999) is a Filipino professional basketball player for the Rain or Shine Elasto Painters of the Philippine Basketball Association (PBA).

Professional career

Rain or Shine Elasto Painters (2022–present)
Mamuyac was selected 5th overall pick by the Rain or Shine Elasto Painters in 2022 PBA draft. As a rookie, he earned his first PBA All-Star Game selection in 2023.

PBA career statistics 

As of the end of 2022–23 season

Season-by-season averages 

|-
| align=left | 
| align=left | Rain or Shine
| 30 || 21.8 || .432 || .269 || .744 || 3.0 || 2.1 || 1.1 || .2 || 9.9
|-class=sortbottom
| align="center" colspan=2 | Career
| 30 || 21.8 || .432 || .269 || .744 || 3.0 || 2.1 || 1.1 || .2 || 9.9

References

External links
 PBA.ph profile

1999 births
Living people
Ateneo Blue Eagles men's basketball players
Basketball players from Quezon City
Filipino men's basketball players
Philippine Basketball Association All-Stars
Philippines men's national basketball team players
Rain or Shine Elasto Painters draft picks
Rain or Shine Elasto Painters players
Shooting guards